This is a list of large wind farms in the United States.  Many of the wind farms in the United States are located in the Great Plains.

Onshore wind farms

Listed are wind farms with a generating capacity of at least 150 megawatts (MW) or any of the three largest farms in its state with a generating capacity of at least 120 MW.

Offshore wind farms

As of 2020, there are two operational offshore wind farms in the United States. Block Island Wind Farm opened in December 2016 in Rhode Island waters. Coastal Virginia Offshore Wind opened in 2020.

Planned wind farms

See also 

 List of offshore wind farms in the United States
 List of U.S. states by electricity production from renewable sources
 List of wind turbine manufacturers
 Renewable portfolio standard 
 Wind ENergy Data & Information (WENDI) Gateway

References

External links

Proposed offshore wind projects in North America
Map of US wind projects

 Wind
Wind farms
United States